The 2006–07 Cypriot Second Division was the 52nd season of the Cypriot second-level football league. APOP Kinyras won their 2nd title.

Format
Fourteen teams participated in the 2006–07 Cypriot Second Division. All teams played against each other twice, once at their home and once away. The team with the most points at the end of the season crowned champions. The first three teams were promoted to 2007–08 Cypriot First Division and the last three teams were relegated to the 2007–08 Cypriot Third Division.

Changes from previous season
Teams promoted to 2006–07 Cypriot First Division
 AEP Paphos
 Aris Limassol
 Ayia Napa

Teams relegated from 2005–06 Cypriot First Division
 APOP Kinyras
 APEP
 THOI Lakatamia

Teams promoted from 2005–06 Cypriot Third Division
 AEM Mesogis
 ASIL Lysi
 Akritas Chlorakas

Teams relegated to 2006–07 Cypriot Third Division
 Elpida Xylofagou
 Ethnikos Assia
 SEK Agiou Athanasiou

League standings

Results

See also
 Cypriot Second Division
 2006–07 Cypriot First Division
 2006–07 Cypriot Cup
 2006–07 in Cypriot football

Sources

2. DIVISION 2006–07

Cypriot Second Division seasons
Cyprus
2006–07 in Cypriot football